Jean François Langlois (26 June 1808 – ?) was a New Zealand whaler and coloniser. He was born in La Luzerne, in Normandy, France on 26 June 1808.

References

1808 births
French emigrants to New Zealand
New Zealand people in whaling
Year of death missing
Akaroa